The Rebellion Beer Company in Marlow Bottom, Buckinghamshire, England is a microbrewery that produces regular and seasonal beers. It uses the chalky water of the local Chiltern Hills, which has high levels of minerals and salts.

History
It was founded in 1993 by two former students of Sir William Borlase's Grammar School, and is now brewing around 125 barrels per week, serving over 200 pubs in a 30-mile radius of Marlow. In 1998 it bought Courage's former Pilot Brewery, and in 2003 acquired a pub lease, the Three Horseshoes in Marlow.  The brewery hosts open evenings coupled with a tour every first Tuesday of each month for visitors and every second Tuesday of each month for the 2000 members of its beer club.

Beer varieties
The Rebellion brewery produces three all-year ales; IPA (India Pale Ale; 3.7% ABV), 'Smuggler' (4.1% ABV), and 'Mutiny' (4.5% ABV).  These names follow in a tradition of giving beers subversive or rebellious names. In addition, there are five seasonal ales such as 'Red' and 'Blonde' (which are also available to buy bottled year-round), as well as one-off monthly brews.

These beers are available in many local pubs, as well as from the Rebellion Brewery Shop. Rebellion beer is also sold in Waitrose. The company specializes in beer made with all-natural ingredients that are designed to be flavourful, as part of a marketing strategy to increase sales through supermarkets offering a greater selection of artisan beers.

Awards
The Rebellion Beer Company has won numerous awards from the Society of Independent Brewers at both a local and national level. Its Rebellion White won the supreme champion award in the wheat beer challenge of the Society of Independent Brewers in 2003.

See also

 Brewery
 List of microbreweries

References

External links
 Official website

Marlow, Buckinghamshire
1993 establishments in England
Breweries in England
British companies established in 1993
Food and drink companies established in 1993